Peter MacDonald (born December 16, 1928) is a Native American politician and the only four term Chairman of the Navajo Nation. MacDonald was born in Arizona, U.S. and served the U.S. Marine Corps in World War II as a Navajo Code Talker. He was first elected Navajo Tribal Chairman in 1970.

In 1989, MacDonald was removed from office by the Navajo Tribal Council, pending the results of federal criminal investigations headed by the Bureau of Indian Affairs. MacDonald was sent to federal prison in 1990 for violations of US law and subsequently convicted of more U.S. federal crimes, including fraud, extortion, riot, bribery, and corruption.

Life and politics
Born Hashkasilt Begay, MacDonald was raised among traditional shepherds and groomed as a medicine man. He entered the Marine Corps as a Navajo language code talker during World War II. The war ended soon after his training was complete and he was deployed in post-war China to guard surrendered Japanese officers.

After the war, MacDonald earned an electrical engineering degree at the University of Oklahoma. Upon graduation, his acumen secured a job at the Hughes Aircraft Company, working on the Polaris nuclear missile project. He returned to the Navajo Nation in 1963 and began a career in tribal politics.

MacDonald served as Navajo Nation Tribal Chairman for four terms between the years 1970 to 1986. During his tenure, MacDonald stressed self-sufficiency and tribal enterprise as key components of his political goals. He worked to extend tribal control over education and over mineral leases and co-founded the Council of Energy Resource Tribes (CERT) in 1975. CERT favored accelerated development of energy resources on tribal lands. MacDonald is credited with starting the Navajo Nation Shopping Centers Enterprise, Navajo Engineering and Construction Authority, and many other Navajo-owned enterprises. MacDonald was critical of the Bureau of Indian Affairs and fought against federal encroachments on Tribal sovereignty.

During the 1972 presidential campaign, MacDonald was referred to as "the most powerful Indian in the USA". He was a member of Richard Nixon's Committee to Re-Elect the President (CRP), and was scheduled, at the urging of Senator Barry Goldwater, to speak at the 1972 Republican National Convention.

Concluding that Nixon's support for the Navajo position in a land dispute with the Hopi was tepid, MacDonald met with Democratic presidential candidate George McGovern, chair of a Senate Subcommittee on Indian Affairs. When McGovern pledged to back the Navajo position, MacDonald considered supporting McGovern's presidential bid. As tribal chairman, he could rally a solid block of votes across the reservation.

This displeased Goldwater. Two years later, Goldwater's displeasure increased, when MacDonald delivered 9,006 out of a total 10,274 Navajo votes to help elect Democrat Raul Castro as governor of Arizona.

Goldwater supported the Hopi in the land dispute. In the end, thousands of Navajo families lost their homes, cementing the rift between Arizona's senior senator and the leader of Arizona's largest tribe.

In 1996, Congress passed a law allowing extended families to stay on their lands for seventy-five more years. The Navajos agreed to a number of restrictions on the economy. The so-called The Bennett Freeze affecting thousands of MacDonald's Navajo was not lifted until 2009 when US President Barack Obama repealed the "Freeze".

Public services 
American Indian National Bank, Washington, DC: Co-Founder and member of the Board. Established the first Native American banking system in the country to serve tribes across the United States.

National Tribal Chairman Association, Washington, DC: Co-Founder and member of the Executive Board. An organization of elected tribal leaders to speak with one voice (officially) on behalf of their constituents.

Council of Energy Resources Tribes (CERT), Denver, CO: Co-Founder and Chairman of the Council. Organized to effect changes in management and protection of Native American energy resources and to receive fair market value for tribal resources.

President's National Energy Task Force; Washington, DC: Appointed by President Ronald Reagan.

National Nuclear Waste Management Task Force Commission; Washington, DC; Appointed by President Jimmy Carter

Navajo Community College Board of Regents; member, Tsaile, AZ

Bacone Junior College Board of Regents, member; Bacone, OK

University of Oklahoma Board of Visitors, member; Norman, OK

Native American Preparatory School (NAPS) Board of Trustees and co-founder (1986–1988)

United States Marine Corps Education and Training Board of Advisors, member; appointed by United States Secretary of Navy

National Indian Self-determination Task Force, Co-Chairman; Washington, D.C. appointed by President Richard Nixon

American Indian Policy Review Commission, member; U.S. Congress (1975–1976)

Commission for Older Americans; U.S. Department of Health, Education & Welfare.

New Mexico Governor's Energy Task Force (1972)

Board of Directors, National Association for Community Development (1986–1970)

Publications 
MacDonald published an autobiography in 1993 called The Last Warrior.

Allegations and charges
On February 17, 1988, a divided Navajo Tribal Council placed MacDonald on administrative leave. Chairman MacDonald refused to step down from his position, leading to a five-month stand-off. By March of that year, the council appointed an interim chairman. Remaining MacDonald supporters known as "Peter's Patrol" responded by occupying the leader's offices.

In 1990, a Navajo tribal judge ordered Peter MacDonald Sr., after being suspended by the Navajo Council, to face three criminal trials instead of a single trial on 111 criminal counts., raising questions of double jeopardy.

In the third case, MacDonald was charged with violating tribal election law by accepting illegal campaign contributions from non-Navajos. In this case, MacDonald stood trial with Johnny R. Thompson, the suspended Navajo vice-chairman.

Bud Brown, given immunity, testified against MacDonald, alleging that the chairman pressured him into the Big Boquillas deal. He was allowed to keep the $4 million profit from the land sale and face no jail time.

Government prosecutors, in retrospect, have commented to the New York Times their misgivings of the charges and trial. "I've always wondered if we (prosecutors) were the dupes," one remarked.

Inciting riots and prison
The Navajo Nation Council suspended MacDonald in February 1989. The council had suspected that MacDonald accepted kickbacks from contractors and corporations. Turmoil ensued, culminating in a riot in Window Rock five months later that led to the shooting deaths of two MacDonald supporters and the injury of two tribal police officers. They had stormed the tribal headquarters in an attempt to restore him to power, according to the Associated Press , which is commonly known as the "Peter MacDonald Riot".

MacDonald was eventually convicted of defrauding the Navajo Nation in tribal court, but served only a few months of that sentence before being convicted in federal court of conspiracy to commit burglary and kidnapping charges connected to the Window Rock riot.

MacDonald was convicted on US Federal conspiracy charges for inciting the riot and for taking bribes and kickbacks. MacDonald also served a federal sentence for fraud and racketeering convictions.

In 1990, Peter MacDonald was sent to the Federal Correctional Institution, Fort Worth Texas. Within several years was convicted of more US federal crimes including fraud, extortion, riot, bribery, and corruption stemming from the Navajo purchase of the Big Boquillas Ranch in Northwestern Arizona. MacDonald was then moved from the general federal prison unit into a prison hospital after experiencing chest pains.

MacDonald had been imprisoned at the Federal Correctional Institution, Fort Worth, since 1992.

Commuted prison sentence
The Navajo Tribal Council pardoned MacDonald in 1995 as he was serving his sentence at the Federal Correctional Institution, Fort Worth – noting in their pardon that certain allegations could not possibly have been true and re-establishing the Navajo concept of hozhonji, the Beauty Way, and the need to forgive and ask forgiveness.

Presidential
The day before President Bill Clinton left office in 2001, U.S. Rep. Patrick J. Kennedy lobbied the White House to commute the sentence of the former leader. President Clinton granted the request, along with dozens of other commutations and pardons.

Return to Navajoland
"I sincerely believe that we will all be better off if we return to the traditional Navajo system in which the family was important and everyone fulfilled their roles and responsibility for preparing our children for life," said the former Navajo Nation Chairman.

Since his return from federal prison, MacDonald has remained a public figure advocating for increased Navajo sovereignty away from federal domains on certain aspects. He speaks at conferences, meetings and education venues.

In 2017, MacDonald, along with Fleming Begaye Sr. (PVT, USMC), Roy Hawthorne (CPL, USMC), Thomas H. Begay (CPL, USMC), Samuel Holiday (PFC, USMC) and Alfred Newman (PFC, USMC) were honored in a White House Ceremony by President Donald Trump. MacDonald spoke alongside the president.

See also
 1989 Navajo Nation Council reforms
 List of Native American politicians

References

External links
 
Documentaries, topic pages and databases
 The New York Times (1990): Ex-Navajo Leader Is Facing 3 Criminal Trials
 Peter MacDonald and the Navajo Nation
 Navajo Chairman Sentenced to 6 Years in Tribal Jail for Bribery, Ethics Violations
 The Price of Doing Business: After eight years in federal prison, former Navajo Tribal Chairman Peter MacDonald has returned to the reservation.
 Navajo Times endures shutdown, gains independence 
 Undaunted muckraker
 MacDonald: Where are the Navajo millionaires?
 Former Navajo Nation chairman calls for a return to traditional Navajo family values 
 Former Navajo chairman speaks on elder abuse-2006
 MacDonald applies for city job – Gallup Independent

1928 births
20th-century Native Americans
21st-century Native Americans
Navajo code talkers
Navajo people
American politicians convicted of corruption
Arizona Republicans
Chairmen of the Navajo Tribe
Living people
Place of birth missing (living people)
Recipients of American presidential clemency
University of Oklahoma alumni
Arizona politicians convicted of crimes
Native American people from Arizona